Mae Lang (born 4 February 1996) is an Estonian professional racing cyclist, who currently rides for UCI Women's Continental Team . She rode in the women's road race at the 2019 UCI Road World Championships in Yorkshire, England.

References

External links

1996 births
Living people
Estonian female cyclists
Place of birth missing (living people)
European Games competitors for Estonia
Cyclists at the 2019 European Games